Tokke is a municipality in Vestfold og Telemark county, Norway. It is located in the traditional district of Vest-Telemark. The administrative centre of the municipality is the village of Dalen. Other villages in Tokke include Åmdals Verk, Eidsborg, Høydalsmo, Lårdal, and Øvre Byrte. The Eidsborg Stave Church is one of Norway's old stave churches and it is located in Eidsborg, just north of Dalen.

The  municipality is the 117th largest by area out of the 356 municipalities in Norway. Tokke is the 271st most populous municipality in Norway with a population of 2,140.

General information

During the 1960s, there were many municipal mergers across Norway due to the work of the Schei Committee. On 1 January 1964, the neighboring municipalities of Lårdal (population: 1,929) and Mo (population: 1,658) were merged to form the new municipality of Tokke.

Name
The municipality is named after the local river Tokke. The name is related to the name of the lake Totak (from which the river originates). The river name is probably derived from the Old Norse word  meaning "roaring", "rushing", or "howling".

Coat of arms
The coat of arms was granted on 6 February 1987. The official blazon is "Or a bear passant sable". This means the arms have a field (background) with a tincture of Or which means it is colored yellow most of the time, but if it is made out of metal, then gold is used. The charge is a bear which is displayed with a tincture of sable which means it is black. The bear symbolizes the rich nature in the forests in the municipality. The bear also plays a major role in many local legends and stories. The arms were designed by Stein Davidsen.

Churches
The Church of Norway has two parishes within the municipality of Tokke. It is part of the Øvre Telemark prosti (deanery) in the Diocese of Agder og Telemark.

Geography
Tokke Municipality is located in the Vest-Telemark region. It borders the municipalities of Vinje, Kviteseid, Seljord, Fyresdal (in Telemark) and the municipalities of Valle and Bykle (in Agder). Other mountains in Tokke including Brandsnutene, Gråsteinsnosi, Sæbyggjenuten, Stølsdalsnutane, and Svolhusgreini. The river Tokke and the lakes Bandak, Botnedalsvatn, and Byrtevatn are all located in the municipality as well.

Government
All municipalities in Norway, including Tokke, are responsible for primary education (through 10th grade), outpatient health services, senior citizen services, welfare and other social services, zoning, economic development, and municipal roads and utilities. The municipality is governed by a municipal council of elected representatives, which in turn elect a mayor.

Municipal council
The municipal council  of Tokke is made up of 21 representatives that are elected to four year terms. The party breakdown of the municipal council is as follows:

Mayor
The mayors of Tokke:

1964-1971: Gunvald Jupskås 
1972-1979: Olav K. Tho
1980-1984: Gunvald Jupskås
1984-1987: Marie Sund
1988-1989: Geirmund Skaalen (H)
1990-2005: Birger Nygård (Sp)
2005-2011: Olav Seltveit Urbø (Sp)
2011-2015: Hilde Alice Vågslid (Ap)
2015–present: Jarand Felland (Sp)

Notable residents

 Talleiv Huvestad (1761 in Skafså – 1847), a teacher, farmer and politician
 Søren Georg Abel (1772 in Mo – 1820), a Norwegian priest and politician
 Jens Matthias Pram Kaurin (1804 in Lårdal – 1863), a theology professor and Lutheran priest
 Marcus Jacob Monrad (1816–1897), a Norwegian philosopher and academic, grew up in Mo
 Vetle Vislie (1858 in Skafså – 1933), a Norwegian educationalist, writer and politician
 Alf Blütecher (1880 in Lårdal – 1959), a Norwegian actor
 Thomas Offenberg Backer (1892 in Mo – 1987), a Norwegian engineer
 Andreas Backer (1895 in Mo – 1975), a Norwegian journalist and newspaper editor
 Anne Grimdalen (1899 in Skafså – 1961), a Norwegian sculptor
 Eivind Groven (1901 in Eidsborg – 1977), a microtonal composer and music-theorist
 Arvid Torgeir Lie (1938 in Skafså – 2020), a Norwegian poet, short story writer and translator
 Lene Vågslid (born 1986 in Tokke), a Norwegian teacher and politician

References

External links

Municipal fact sheet from Statistics Norway 
Description of Tokke

 
Municipalities of Vestfold og Telemark
1964 establishments in Norway